Gregory is a city in San Patricio County, Texas, United States. The population was 1,907 at the 2010 census.

Geography

Gregory is located at  (27.920604, –97.292480).

Demographics

2020 census

As of the 2020 United States census, there were 1,740 people, 644 households, and 497 families residing in the city.

2000 census
As of the census of 2000, there were 2,318 people, 658 households, and 561 families residing in the city. The population density was 1,636.8 people per square mile (630.3/km2). There were 743 housing units at an average density of 524.6/sq mi (202.0/km2). The racial makeup of the city was 70.10% White, 0.60% African American, 0.65% Native American, 0.09% Asian, 0.04% Pacific Islander, 25.37% from other races, and 3.15% from two or more races. Hispanic or Latino of any race were 94.65% of the population.

There were 658 households, out of which 43.6% had children under the age of 18 living with them, 61.1% were married couples living together, 16.3% had a female householder with no husband present, and 14.6% were non-families. 13.7% of all households were made up of individuals, and 5.2% had someone living alone who was 65 years of age or older. The average household size was 3.52 and the average family size was 3.85.

In the city, the population was spread out, with 33.4% under the age of 18, 10.6% from 18 to 24, 26.0% from 25 to 44, 20.2% from 45 to 64, and 9.8% who were 65 years of age or older. The median age was 30 years. For every 100 females, there were 97.4 males. For every 100 females age 18 and over, there were 93.1 males.

The median income for a household in the city was $31,250, and the median income for a family was $33,750. Males had a median income of $29,375 versus $16,226 for females. The per capita income for the city was $10,752. About 16.8% of families and 18.7% of the population were below the poverty line, including 23.1% of those under age 18 and 20.3% of those age 65 or over.

Education

Gregory is served by the Gregory-Portland Independent School District.

Stephen F. Austin Elementary School (PK–5) is in Gregory. A new elementary school was built for the 2007–2008 school year.

Gregory-Portland Intermediate School (6), Gregory-Portland Junior High School (7–8), and Gregory-Portland High School (9–12) in nearby Portland also serves Gregory.

Media
The 1981 film Raggedy Man starring Sissy Spacek was set in Gregory in 1944. She played the town's telephone operator.

Historic facts

Gregory once had a high school named Gregory High School that schooled residents of Gregory and Portland. Later, it was moved to Portland, named Gregory-Portland High School and remains there to this present day.

References

Cities in Texas
Cities in San Patricio County, Texas
Cities in the Corpus Christi metropolitan area